John Devaney (born April 10, 1958) is a Canadian former ice hockey player. He played with Team Canada at the 1980 Winter Olympics. Devaney led the team in scoring, with four goals and three assists in six games.

Career 
Before the Olympics he was an all-star and two-time national champion with the University of Alberta Golden Bears hockey team. Later, he played one season in Switzerland with EHC Visp where he scored 27 goals and 16 assists in 34 games.

He continued in hockey as a coach at his university (where he received a B.Comm) and junior hockey before becoming a chartered account.

References

External links

1958 births
Living people
Canadian ice hockey centres
Ice hockey players at the 1980 Winter Olympics
Olympic ice hockey players of Canada
Ice hockey people from Edmonton